William Wilson Potter (December 18, 1792 – October 28, 1839) was a member of the U.S. House of Representatives from Pennsylvania.

William W. Potter was born at Potters Mills, Pennsylvania.  He completed preparatory studies in Bellefonte, Pennsylvania, and graduated from Dickinson College in Carlisle, Pennsylvania.  He studied law, was admitted to the bar in 1814 and practiced his profession.

Potter was elected as a Democrat to the Twenty-fifth and Twenty-sixth Congresses and served until his death, before the assembling of the Twenty-sixth Congress, in Bellefonte.  Interment in Union Cemetery in Bellefonte.

See also
List of United States Congress members who died in office (1790–1899)

Sources

The Political Graveyard

Pennsylvania lawyers
1792 births
1839 deaths
Burials in Pennsylvania
People from Centre County, Pennsylvania
Democratic Party members of the United States House of Representatives from Pennsylvania
19th-century American politicians
19th-century American lawyers